Avenida Suba is a major road in northern Bogotá, Colombia, connecting the locality of Suba with the rest of the capital.

Etymology 
Avenida Suba is named after the locality Suba. Suba is either derived from the Chibcha contraction Suba, meaning "Flower of the Sun" (uba = "fruit" or "flower", sua = "Sun", minus its last vowel, making it a possessive) or from the words sua (Sun) and sie (water). It is also known as Troncal Suba due to being one of the main lines in the TransMilenio system.

Route 
Its southern end begins at the intersection of Avenida NQS with Calle 80 in the locality of Barrios Unidos. It runs north entering Suba at Calle 100. At the shopping center Centro Suba it splits into two, turning into Avenida Transversal de Suba (Calle 145) and Antigua Avenida de Suba (Calle 139).

Points of interest along the route 
 The Portal de Suba of the TransMilenio system
 Iserra 100 shopping center
 Bulevar Niza shopping center
 Centro Suba shopping center
 The Colina Campestre neighborhood

Gallery

References 

Streets in Bogotá
Suba